Fred Hemmings, retired from competition as a surfer, began his career as an event promoter and ran the Smirnoff World Pro-Am Surfing Championships between 1969 and 1977.

The Smirnoff World Pro-Am became known as the de facto professional World Championship because the International Surfing Federation had been unable to establish a format or sponsorship, so no official amateur championships were held between 1973 and 1975. Laura Lee Ching became the first woman to compete in the Smirnoff World Pro-Am in 1973. 

The Smirnoff World Pro-Am Surfing Championships were superseded by the International Professional Surfers (IPS).

References

Surfing competitions
Recurring sporting events established in 1969